Jesse Christensen (born 7 September 1998) is a South African cricketer. He made his List A debut for Western Province in the 2016–17 CSA Provincial One-Day Challenge on 5 March 2017. He made his first-class debut for Western Province in the 2016–17 Sunfoil 3-Day Cup on 23 March 2017.

References

External links
 

1998 births
Living people
South African cricketers
Western Province cricketers
Cricketers from Cape Town